Television School is an online educational website with pay per view video lessons that teach the creative and business sides of creating content for television and digital platforms.

The video lessons are hosted by Christina Wayne, CEO of Assembly Entertainment, who draws from her 25 years of experience in the entertainment business as a network executive, studio head and Executive Producer in series television. Wayne was formerly the president of Cineflix Studios from its inception, where she produced Copper for BBC America. She previously ran scripted programming at AMC, where she developed and oversaw Breaking Bad and Mad Men.

References

External links
IT Certifications

Educational technology companies of the United States
Virtual learning environments
E-learning